Jefferson Moreira Nascimento (born 5 July 1988), known simply as Jefferson, is a Brazilian professional footballer who plays was a left-back.

Club career
Born in Campo Formoso, Bahia, Jefferson represented in his country Associação Desportiva São Caetano, Guaratinguetá Futebol, Sociedade Esportiva Palmeiras, Grêmio Barueri Futebol, Fluminense FC, Clube Náutico Capibaribe and Santa Cruz Futebol Clube. His Série A input consisted of 11 matches in representation of the third and fifth clubs, over three separate seasons; interspersed with that, he had a one-year spell in Portugal with G.D. Estoril Praia.

Jefferson returned to Estoril for the 2012–13 campaign, with the team now in the Primeira Liga. He scored his first goal as a professional on 11 November 2012 to help to a 2–0 home defeat of Moreirense FC, and also found the net against Sporting CP (3–1 home win) and S.L. Benfica (1–1, away) in an eventual fifth-place finish, with the subsequent qualification to the UEFA Europa League; most of his five successful strikes across all competitions came from long-distance shots.

On 7 June 2013, Jefferson signed a four-year contract with Sporting. He netted twice from 26 appearances in his debut season, helping to a runner-up position.

Jefferson celebrated his 50th appearance in the Portuguese top division on 5 April 2014, in a match against F.C. Paços de Ferreira. On 16 June 2017, he (on loan) and teammate Ricardo Esgaio (permanent transfer) joined S.C. Braga as Rodrigo Battaglia moved in the opposite direction.

Club statistics

Honours
Palmeiras
Campeonato Paulista: 2008

Sporting CP
Taça de Portugal: 2014–15, 2018–19
Taça da Liga: 2018–19
Supertaça Cândido de Oliveira: 2015

References

External links

1988 births
Living people
Brazilian footballers
Association football defenders
Campeonato Brasileiro Série A players
Associação Desportiva São Caetano players
Guaratinguetá Futebol players
Sociedade Esportiva Palmeiras players
Fluminense FC players
Clube Náutico Capibaribe players
Santa Cruz Futebol Clube players
Paysandu Sport Club players
Esporte Clube XV de Novembro (Piracicaba) players
Primeira Liga players
Liga Portugal 2 players
G.D. Estoril Praia players
Sporting CP footballers
Sporting CP B players
S.C. Braga players
Casa Pia A.C. players
Swiss Super League players
FC Lugano players
Brazilian expatriate footballers
Expatriate footballers in Portugal
Expatriate footballers in Switzerland
Brazilian expatriate sportspeople in Portugal
Brazilian expatriate sportspeople in Switzerland